Hajj Aqa (also Romanized as Ḩājj Āqā; also known as Hājī Aqā, Haji Aqu, and Ḩājjī Āqā) is a village in Mehranrud-e Jonubi Rural District, in the Central District of Bostanabad County, East Azerbaijan Province, Iran. At the 2006 census, its population was 1,376, in 359 families.

References 

Populated places in Bostanabad County